Sikhuran or Sikhvoran or Sikhowran or Si Khvoran, also rendered as Sikhoran, also known as:
 Sikhuran, Hormozgan
 Si Khvoran-e Bala, Hormozgan Province
 Sikhvoran, Kerman